A Very Potter Senior Year (often shortened to AVPSY) is a musical written by Matt Lang, Nick Lang, and Brian Holden with songs by Clark Baxtresser, Pierce Siebers, A. J. Holmes, and additional songs by Darren Criss. It is the conclusion of the Very Potter trilogy of Harry Potter-inspired musicals produced over four years by StarKid Productions. Rather than a full musical, as with its previous installments, the production took the form of a live staged reading of the script with performances of the songs at LeakyCon in Chicago, Illinois, on August 11, 2012. It featured nearly all of the StarKid actors and actresses who had starred in previous StarKid shows to date, including actor Darren Criss, who returned to the company to reprise his role as Harry Potter, and Evanna Lynch as Luna Lovegood, who played the character in the original film series.

The script and soundtrack became available in December 2012, and official footage of the musical was released on the StarKid YouTube channel on March 15, 2013. In March 2013, it had reached over 400,000 views, making the StarKid Productions page the most viewed of the month and has gone on to reach over 600,000 views.  On the YouTube recording, Darren Criss' microphone did not record and, consequently, all of his audio had to be pulled from different mics. The story is a parody, based on several of the Harry Potter novels (particularly Harry Potter and the Chamber of Secrets and Harry Potter and the Half-Blood Prince) by J. K. Rowling, as well as their film counterparts.

Synopsis

A Very Potter Senior Year draws heavily upon the Chamber of Secrets and Half-Blood Prince novels.

Act I

Luna Lovegood and Neville Longbottom wander the Department of Mysteries, chased by Death Eaters. The Death Eaters manage to retrieve Tom Riddle's diary from a safe in the Ministry, but this is taken from them by Ron, who rescues Luna and Neville. The three join Hermione outside the Room of Death, but are again surrounded by foes ("This Is The End"). Harry appears and rescues the group, aided by Kingsley Shacklebolt and the Wizard Cops. Mad-Eye Moody enters the scene, who Harry reveals to be the Death Eater Barty Crouch Jr. in disguise. Crouch is apprehended by the Wizard Cops, but leaves Harry with the ominous message that, with Voldemort defeated, Harry's importance to the wizarding world will fade.

Later at the Burrow, Harry presents his girlfriend, Ginny, with Riddle's diary, not knowing its powers. Ron complains to Harry that Hermione has become obsessed with the writings of Gilderoy Lockhart, and that the two have not kissed since the events of A Very Potter Musical. At the breakfast table, Ron is given the keys to the family car, and he flies Harry, Hermione, and Ginny to Hogwarts to start the school year ("Senior Year"). Ron crash lands into the Herbology greenhouse, destroying the crop of mandrakes and killing Professor Sprout. Professor McGonagall enters and threatens to expel the students, however Draco Malfoy provides an alibi framing Dora the Explorer and the four students escape punishment. Despite this, Harry refuses to acknowledge Draco's friendship.

In the Great Hall, Harry and Draco are announced as the two candidates for the coming Head Boy election. Gilderoy Lockhart is announced to be the new Defence Against the Dark Arts teacher, much to the delight of Hermione and the other students ("Wizard Of The Year"). Lockhart quickly proves more popular than even Harry, who in turn tries unsuccessfully to maintain his position as favorite among the student body. Harry consequently ends his relationship with Ginny, who turns to the diary for comfort. The diary contains the last remaining piece of Riddle's soul and, in the first of several flashbacks, Riddle shows Ginny his first encounter with Dumbledore while still living in a Muggle orphanage ("Always Dance"). Ginny quickly falls under Riddle's spell.

Hermione waits in line to receive an autograph from Lockhart, who tasks her with writing Harry's biography. Draco and Harry begin their preparations for the coming Head Boy election, when Harry suddenly overhears the Basilisk. Just then, a scream is heard, and the group discovers Colin Creevey and an entranced Ginny in front of a message written in blood. Colin has been petrified, while Ginny quickly awakens and exits the scene, her hands covered in blood. The message declares that the Chamber of Secrets has been opened, and Harry sees the dangerous situation as an opportunity to regain his popularity among the students.

Ginny tries to wash the blood off of her hands in the girls' bathroom, unable to make sense of the situation. She again writes in the diary and, in the second flashback, Riddle shows the aftermath of his first murder and his decision to visit the Riddle home ("When You Have To Go All The Way Home"). Back in the present, Harry takes Cho as his date to Nearly Headless Nick's Deathday Party. The date does not go well, and Harry is jealous to see Ginny accompanied by Seamus and Dean. Ron is also there, however unaccompanied, as Hermione is busily working to complete Lockhart's assignment. Lavender Brown reveals that she has feelings for Ron and pecks him on the cheek, which he considers an act of betrayal to Hermione. After Ginny leaves, Harry confronts Dean to which Dean points out that Ginny isn't his girlfriend or his property. Seamus, Cho and Dean all announce their newfound hatred with Harry whilst Ron is forced to convince Lavender that he wants to break up. Draco arrives and puts roller skates and marbles on the floor causing Harry to destroy McGonagall's ice sculpture.

After the party, Hermione arrives and gets into an argument with Ron and Harry. Harry overhears the Basilisk a second time. Together with Hermione and Ron, he finds a petrified Nearly Headless Nick and an entranced Ginny, who again flees the scene upon regaining full consciousness. The trio follow a trail of spiders to the Forbidden Forest, where they encounter Aragog ("Get In My Mouth"). Aragog tries to eat the three friends, but Hagrid appears to rescue them.

In the third flashback, Riddle shows Ginny his only meeting with his father, his discovery of his Muggle background, and the subsequent murder of his last remaining family members. In the present, Harry and Draco tie in the elections for Head Boy after most of the student body cast write in votes for Fozzie Bear. Lockhart proposes a wizard duel to settle the tie, and Draco intends to forfeit because he regards Harry as a friend. Not knowing this, Harry insults Draco and says they aren't friends and unknowingly goads him into fighting as well as regarding Harry now as an enemy. ("Tonight This School Is Mine"). Draco uses his Serpensortia spell to conjure a snake, and Harry consequently reveals his Parseltongue ability before the entire school. This event makes Harry the principal suspect as Slytherin's heir, a view supported by Lockhart, who taunts Harry into forfeiting. Draco is announced as the winner of the duel and as new Head Boy.

Harry laments his downfall while Ginny reads of Riddle's remorse ("When I Was..."). Harry decides to leave Hogwarts, and Riddle finally reveals himself to be Lord Voldemort before Ginny. Riddle's soul has now grown strong enough to fully control Ginny, despite not yet being able to assume human form. As the first act comes to a close, Voldemort summons the Basilisk, promising it finer prey than vermin.

Act II

After Hannah Abbott is petrified, Professor McGonagall announces that the school will be closed unless the Chamber of Secrets is found and the Basilisk slain. Draco reveals to Hermione that Ron had cheated on her, and the two break up. Following Cho's advice, Hermione decides to take revenge on Ron by cheating on him with Lockhart. However, Hermione fails to woo her professor, and instead signs a release form turning over the creative rights to her Harry Potter stories. Lockhart announces several changes to her stories that make them more similar to the J. K. Rowling versions of the story.

In the headmaster's office, Voldemort has Ginny search for the Resurrection Stone. Hermione discovers the truth behind Riddle's diary, but is petrified by the Basilisk. In the infirmary, Ron cries over Hermione's petrified body and his inability to rescue the school ("I'm Just A Sidekick"). Draco is dismayed to see Hermione, and the two boys drink Draco's Felix Felicis potion in a plan to save the day. Draco sets out to find the Chamber of Secrets, while Ron searches for Harry.

While searching for the flying car, Ron runs into Lockhart, who reveals his plan to sell Harry Potter novels and merchandise to the Muggle World, as well as his slandering of Harry during the Head Boy election. Lockhart is chased away by the Wizard Cops, who prepare to close the school.

At Godric's Hollow, Harry arrives. Ron arrives via the Weasley family car but fails to convince Harry to return to Hogwarts. Harry finds the Resurrection Stone inside his lucky Snitch, and the ghosts of his deceased family and friends appear to give him encouragement ("Everything Ends"). Harry and Ron return to Hogwarts and, together with the student body, the Sorting Hat, and the Scarf of Sexual Preference, set out to slay the Basilisk ("Goin' Back To Hogwarts" reprise).

Inside the Chamber, Harry and the students are overpowered by the Basilisk, under the control of the still disembodied Voldemort. Seamus is petrified causing many of the students to get trapped. Scarfy covers the Basilisk's eyes to help but is soon taken off by Voldemort and murdered. Harry succeeds in pulling the sword of Gryffindor from the Sorting Hat and slays the Basilisk, but is bitten in the process ("Harry Freakin' Potter" reprise). As Voldemort stands over a dying Harry, Harry stabs the diary with the sword, killing the fragment of Voldemort's soul and saving Ginny. Hagrid arrives with Fawkes, whose healing tears rescue Harry from near-death.

The petrified students recover from their frozen state following the Basilisk's death, except for Colin Creevey, who dies. Hermione joins the rest of the students in the Chamber. Ron pulls an engagement ring from the Scarf of Sexual Preference and proposes to Hermione, who accepts having heard his song in the infirmary. Harry finally accepts Draco as his friend. Harry later proposes to Ginny who accepts and the students rejoice ("Days of Summer" reprise). Later, as Harry is taking in all the times he had at Hogwarts, Ron arrives to pick him up for the last time. Harry says goodbye to Hogwarts and leaves with Ron.

19 years later, Harry takes his son to platform 9¾ ("Goin' Back to Hogwarts" reprise), where he runs into Quirrell, but fails to recognize him as his enemy from A Very Potter Musical. Voldemort remains bound to the back of Quirrell's skull (following the conclusion of the first musical), and he and Quirrell are at King's Cross to see their daughter leave for Hogwarts. Voldemort has come to terms with his defeat, and says that Harry has taught him how to love and that it is okay to let go of things, even if it hurts. Quirrell, echoing Voldemort's closing line from the first show, replies "Okay is wonderful."

In a post-credits scene not included in the 2012 LeakyCon reading, a shrunken Gilderoy Lockhart finds a new home among a family of mice, which he had previously revealed to Hermione as his secret desire. Lockhart begins to command the mice on how to defeat the cat who is preventing them from acquiring food for their young.

Notable casts

Notes

This production was unique for featuring almost every StarKid actor to date, save for three: Bonnie Gruesen, who played Hermione in the first two musicals, was unavailable for the production due to other commitments (though she wished the cast luck on her Twitter account); Julia Albain, who played Crabbe and the Candy Lady, was announced as part of the cast but had to pull out; Ali Gordon, who had been in Me and My Dick, wasn't able to join the cast because she was acting in Fiddler on the Roof in Vermont at the time.

Musical numbers

Act I
 "This Is The End" – Ron, Neville, Luna, Hermione and Ensemble
 "Senior Year" – Ron, Hermione, Ginny, Harry
 "Wizard Of The Year" – Lockhart and Ensemble
 "Always Dance" – Dumbledore, Tom and Slytherins
 "When You Have to Go All the Way Home" - Bellatrix, Lucius, Clark Baxtresser and Pierce Siebers
 "Get In My Mouth" – Aragog and Ensemble
 "Tonight This School Is Mine" – Draco and Harry 
 "When I Was..." – Harry and Tom

Act II
 "I'm Just A Sidekick" – Ron 
 "Everything Ends" – James, Sirius, Lupin, Lily, Snape and Cedric 
 "Goin' Back to Hogwarts" - Harry, Ron, McGonagall and Company*
 "Harry Freakin' Potter" - Harry and Company*
 "Days of Summer" - Company* 
 "Goin' Back to Hogwarts (Finale)" - Harry*

Songs denoted with a * are not on the A Very Potter Senior Year soundtrack.

Recording
A cast recording of the production was released in December 2012 through Bandcamp and the StarKid Productions website. Only the tracks which were not featured in the earlier musicals are present on the recording.

Britney Coleman replaced Evanna Lynch as Luna Lovegood on the soundtrack, and Darren Criss was replaced by Clark Baxtresser as Harry Potter, because at the time, Criss was working on Glee, and the production owned the rights to his voice.

See also
 Lists of musicals

References

External links
 StarKid Productions official website
 StarKid Productions on YouTube

2013 YouTube videos
2012 musicals
Fantasy parodies
Musical parodies
Musicals based on novels
Sequel plays
StarKid Productions musicals
Works based on Harry Potter